William or Bill Samuels may refer to:

Bill Samuels (political activist), New York businessman and political activist
Bill Samuels, character in The Outsider (King novel)
William Samuels (boxer) on Template:Welsh Boxing Hall of Fame Inductees